C/2021 T4 (Lemmon) is an inbound long period comet discovered by the Mount Lemmon Observatory on 7 October 2021.

References 

Cometary object articles
Non-periodic comets
Comets in 2021
Astronomical objects discovered in 2021
Oort cloud
Discoveries by MLS